Draper's Windmill or Old Mill is a Grade II listed Smock mill in Margate, Kent, England  that was built in 1845.

History

Draper's Windmill was built in 1845 by John Holman, the Canterbury millwright, replacing an earlier mill that had previously been moved here from Nayland Point. It is the sole survivor of a group of three windmills, Draper's Mill, Little Draper's Mill and The Pumper. A mill was marked on Robert Morden's map of 1695, Harris's map of 1719 and the 1819-43 Ordnance Survey (OS) map. The 1858-72 OS map shows three mills. The 1903-10 OS map shows two mills. The mill worked by wind until 1916, and by a  gas engine until the late 1930s. The sails and fantail were removed in 1927. The mill was threatened with demolition in 1965, but the Draper's Windmill Trust was formed by Mr R M Towes the then Head Master of Drapers Mills School (opposite Drapers Windmill) to preserve the mill, and in 1968 the Kent Education Committee acquired the mill, which was restored at a cost of over £2,000. The fantail was replaced in 1970, and one pair of sails were erected in December 1971. The new stage that had been prepared for fitting on Black Mill, Barham was donated to Draper's mill, when Black Mill was destroyed by fire, it was adapted to fit by Vincent Pargeter.
 The second pair of sails were fitted in the autumn of 1974.

Description

Draper's Windmill is a four-storey smock mill on a single-storey brick base. There is a stage at first-floor level. They are carried on a cast-iron windshaft. The mill is winded by a fantail. The Brake Wheel is  diameter. The three pairs of millstones are driven overdrift.

Millers

J Banks 1847
F & E Darby
Thomas Messiter Ind JP
Thomas R Laidlaw

References for above:-

References

Thomas M Ind biographical details verified by Dr John Ind from official records(US census, Madison University archive, Ancestry.com, USA naturalisation records).

External links
Official Website
Draper's Windmill - Visit Thanet
Windmill World page on the mill.

Windmills in Kent
Grinding mills in the United Kingdom
Smock mills in England
Grade II listed buildings in Kent
Windmills completed in 1845
Museums in Thanet District
Mill museums in England
Octagonal buildings in the United Kingdom